The King's School Rowing Club is a rowing club on the River Dee, based at The Groves, Chester, Cheshire.

History
The club belongs to The King's School, Chester and was founded in 1883.

The club won the prestigious Visitors' Challenge Cup at the Henley Regatta in 1993 and has produced multiple British champions. The 1st VIII also made it to the final of the Princess Elizabeth Challenge Cup in 2006.

Honours

Henley Royal Regatta

British champions

References

Sport in Cheshire
Sport in Chester
Rowing clubs in England
Rowing clubs of the River Dee
Chester
Scholastic rowing in the United Kingdom